Trigonostoma semidisjunctum is a species of sea snail, a marine gastropod mollusc in the family Cancellariidae, the nutmeg snails.

Description

Distribution

References

 Kilburn, R.N. & Rippey, E. (1982) Sea Shells of Southern Africa. Macmillan South Africa, Johannesburg, xi + 249 pp. page(s): 115 
 Hemmen J. (2007). Recent Cancellariidae. Wiesbaden, 428pp
 Petit, R.E. & Harasewych, M.G. (2005) Catalogue of the superfamily Cancellarioidea Forbes and Hanley, 1851 (Gastropoda: Prosobranchia)- 2nd edition. Zootaxa, 1102, 3–161. NIZT 682
 Petit R.E. (2009) George Brettingham Sowerby, I, II & III: their conchological publications and molluscan taxa. Zootaxa 2189: 1–218

Cancellariidae
Gastropods described in 1849